Kaufmann, Alsberg & Co. was a trading, investment banking and brokerage firm. Under the leadership of Irwin Guttag, it became a purely trading company.  With Guttag at the helm, it was sold to American Savings and Loan of Florida in 1984 for $29 million.

Among its most famous alumnus is Israel Englander, who joined the company in 1970 upon his graduation in 1970. Englander left Kaufmann, Alsberg in 1977.

References

Former investment banks of the United States
Financial services companies disestablished in 1984
Defunct financial services companies of the United States